"Incancellabile" (English: Unforgettable) is a song written by Cheope, Marco Marati and Angelo Valsiglio and recorded by Italian singer Laura Pausini. It was released as the first single from the album Le cose che vivi in 1996.
The song was also recorded in Spanish and Portuguese, with the titles "Inolvidable" and "Inesquecível", respectively. The Portuguese version is included only in the Brazilian version of the album.

In 2013, the song is re-recorded with new arrangements for Pausini's compilation album 20 - The Greatest Hits / 20 - Grandes Éxitos.

Music video

Recorded in the end of July 1996 in Iceland (precisely in the Vike zone), atop a volcano crater on the Langisjór region, on the southern part of the island. Shots were taken from the ground and from a helicopter. It was directed by Jamie De La Peña. All the three versions of the song had music videos recorded.

Track listing
CD single – Italy
 "Incancellabile" – 3:48
 "Strani amori" – 4:10
 "Gente" – 4:30
 "Incancellabile" (Instrumental) – 3:48

Promo CD single – Italy
 "Incancellabile" – 3:48
 "Incancellabile" (Instrumental) – 3:48

Charts

Weekly charts

Italian version

Spanish version

Year-end charts

Italian version

Frankie Negrón version

In 1997, American salsa singer, Frankie Negrón covered "Inolvidable" as his debut single. The song peaked at #20 on the Hot Latin Tracks reach #1 on the Latin Tropical Airplay. It was named the best-performing Latin Tropical Airplay of 1997.

Charts

Year-end charts

Sandy & Junior version
The Portuguese-language version of the song was covered in 1998 by Brazilian singing duo Sandy & Junior. Laura Pausini and Sandy have sung this version once together.

See also
List of Billboard Tropical Airplay number ones of 1997

References

1996 singles
1997 debut singles
Laura Pausini songs
Frankie Negrón songs
Pop ballads
Songs written by Cheope
Warner Music Group singles
Warner Music Latina singles
1996 songs
Songs written by Angelo Valsiglio
Compagnia Generale del Disco singles